Run This Town is a 2019 drama film written and directed by Ricky Tollman. It stars Ben Platt, Mena Massoud, Nina Dobrev, Scott Speedman, Gil Bellows, Jennifer Ehle, and Damian Lewis.

It had its world premiere at South by Southwest on March 9, 2019. It was released in the United States and Canada on March 6, 2020, by Oscilloscope and Elevation Pictures.

Premise
The film details the turbulent final year of Rob Ford's tenure as the mayor of Toronto.

Cast
Ben Platt as Bram Shriver
Mena Massoud as Kamal Arafa
Nina Dobrev as Ashley Pollock
Scott Speedman as David
Gil Bellows as Detective Lowey
Jennifer Ehle as Judith
Damian Lewis as Rob Ford
Emmanuel Kabongo as Abe
Hamza Haq as Detective Sharma
Justin Kelly as Neil
Tanner Zipchen as Club Goer

Production
It was announced in March 2018 that Ben Platt, Nina Dobrev, Mena Massoud and Damian Lewis were cast in the film. Filming began the next month in Toronto, along with the additions of Jennifer Ehle, Scott Speedman and Gil Bellows to the cast. Lewis, playing the role of Ford, was spotted on set in extensive makeup and donning a body suit.

Release
The film had its world premiere at South by Southwest on March 9, 2019. It was released commercially in the United States and Canada on March 6, 2020.

Criticism
The film faced some criticism for excising the role of investigative journalists Robyn Doolittle and Kevin Donovan in exposing the scandal, instead replacing them with a fictional novice male journalist. Donovan was critical of the film's portrayal of the media, particularly scenes depicting a reporter paying for the Rob Ford video. Allison Smith stated that Doolittle's replacement with a male journalist was problematic, and the film "would have been more interesting if it had followed Doolittle". She stated that Doolittle may have been replaced because her book Crazy Town: The Rob Ford Story had been optioned for a film or television production.

Joe Mihevc, formerly a councillor on Toronto City Council, stated that the film misrepresents Ford's character, portraying him as a mean-spirited individual and omitting the "humanness of Rob" and the traits that attracted those who voted for him.

The film was also praised by Donovan for its correct portrayal of the backroom politics, and by Smith for the depiction of reporters reconstructing a timeline of Rob Ford's activities based on postings to his social media accounts.

Awards
The film received three Canadian Screen Award nominations at the 8th Canadian Screen Awards, for Best Art Direction/Production Design (Chris Crane), Best Sound Editing (Nelson Ferreira, Dashen Naidoo, J.R. Fountain and Dustin Harris) and Best Makeup (Emily O'Quinn, Steve Newburn and Neil Morrill).

References

External links

Run This Town at Library and Archives Canada

2019 drama films
2019 films
2010s political drama films
American films based on actual events
American political drama films
Canadian drama films
Canadian films based on actual events
Drama films based on actual events
English-language Canadian films
Films about journalists
Films set in 2013
Films set in Toronto
Films shot in Toronto
Rob Ford
2010s English-language films
2010s Canadian films
2010s American films